The Exit & Entry Permit for Taiwan, Republic of China is the document for the bearer to enter and/or depart Taiwan. Currently, there are several types of Exit & Entry Permit that reflect the bearer's residency status. The permit is issued by the National Immigration Agency of the Republic of China (Taiwan). For different purposes, the permit is also known as:

 Taiwan Entry Permit, the travel document issued to the residents of the People's Republic of China (PRC) (including Mainland China, Hong Kong, and Macau) for short term visits to Taiwan. The single-entry permit is a color printed A4 paper, while the multiple-entry permit is a sky blue passport-size booklet. Despite its name, the permit must be used in conjunction with a valid travel document when entering Taiwan, as the permit itself is not a travel document. Specific permanent residents of Hong Kong and Macau are eligible to apply for the permit online or upon arrival in Taiwanese airports.
 Kinmen–Matsu Permit, the travel document issued to the people who has household registration in Kinmen, Matsu, and Penghu to travel to and back from the People's Republic of China through the designated sea ports in these three places. In 2017, a new design of biometric IC card has replaced the historical sky blue passport-size booklet. This type of permit is a valid travel document and the holder can pass the Taiwanese border control without a Taiwan passport. However, to enter Mainland China, a Mainland Travel Permit for Taiwan Residents issued by the PRC is required.

History
Prior to the handover of Hong Kong and Macau, the permit was a passport-like booklet, with the flag of the Republic of China imprinted on the cover. Holders of PRC passports, ROC passports or any travel documents not issued by Hong Kong or Macau were not eligible for the permit.

When Hong Kong was under British rule, holders of British Dependent Territories citizen and British National (Overseas) passports were required to apply for the permit to visit Taiwan, but British citizens were eligible for visa-free access. The permit was also required for holders of Hong Kong Certificate of Identity. Prior to 1997, the permit had to be applied at the Chung Hwa Travel Service in Hong Kong or the Taipei Trade and Tourism Office in Macau. Since the handovers of sovereignty, the application procedures have been eased over time. In 2010, Hong Kong and Macau residents can apply for the simplified Entry Permit without fee charges and can be approved instantly, or they can use the permit-on-arrival service.

As travelling to Taiwan for tourism purposes was not legalized until 2008 for Mainland residents, very few of the permits were issued before then. Since then, travel restrictions for Mainland Chinese have been gradually lifted by the Taiwanese government, although a quota system remains in place.

Eligibility

Residents in Hong Kong and Macau
For residents in Hong Kong and Macau, only holders of HKSAR, MSAR and BN(O) passports with no other travel documents issued by any other country (thereby excludes anyone with multiple citizenship, except persons with both BN(O) and HKSAR passports) are eligible for the permit. Under Taiwanese law, those with nationality or citizenship in another country are no longer considered as "residents in Hong Kong and Macau" and must comply with the visa requirements of their non-Chinese (or BN(O)) nationality or citizenship. For example, a resident in Hong Kong with both HKSAR and British citizen passports must use their British citizen passport to enter Taiwan. Likewise, a resident in Macau with both MSAR and Portuguese passports will need to use the Portuguese one as well. Those with HKSAR, MSAR or BN(O) passports who also have nationalities or passports from a non-visa-exempt country (e.g., Brazil) are required to apply for a Taiwanese visa.

Unlike most Chinese residents, residents in Hong Kong and Macau are not subject to a daily quota of this permit regardless of place of application.

Chinese residents
Chinese residents who apply from China are subject to the quota set forth by the Taiwanese and Chinese governments. As of May 2016, Chinese resident visitors applying from China are subject to a daily quota imposed by Taiwan of 14,600 persons per day, with half of the quota available to individual tour applicants. It was reported that the Chinese authorities also has an unofficial "soft cap" on the numbers of individual and group tourists, ranging from 40% to 50% of the Taiwanese quota. If the daily quota is met, then subsequent applications will no longer be processed until the day with sufficient spaces is reached. In contrast, Chinese residents who hold permanent or non-permanent residence status in a third country or region (including Hong Kong and Macau) are not subject to the quota.

Although Chinese residents automatically lose their Chinese nationality when they acquire nationality or citizenship of another country (unlike Hong Kong and Macau, which have special exemptions to this rule), Chinese residents who reside outside China for less than four years will need to apply for the permit to visit Taiwan before they can comply with the visa requirements of their country of citizenship. An example is those who acquired citizenship or nationality through one of the Immigrant investor programs, as these programs normally do not require lengthy physical residence in the country before granting citizenship.

Application

Online application for Hong Kong and Macau residents
Since 2017, persons who were not born in Hong Kong or Macau and are visiting Taiwan for the first time since they became residents of Hong Kong or Macau can apply for the permit online. From 1 July 2017, it is no longer possible to apply in person at the Taipei Economic and Cultural Office in Hong Kong or Macau. After they have entered Taiwan for the first time with the permit, they are eligible for the simplified online Entry Permit or can alternatively obtain the Exit and Entry Permit on arrival.

Those who were born in Hong Kong or Macau are not required to apply for the permit for tourism purposes. Instead, they are automatically eligible for the no-fee Entry Permit or the permit-on-arrival service by virtue of being born in Hong Kong or Macau.

Application procedures for Mainland China residents
Chinese nationals with (hukou) in Mainland China (including those who are non-permanent residents of Hong Kong or Macau and have relinquished their hukou in Mainland China) face restrictions placed by ROC and PRC governments when applying for the permit. As of August 2016, Mainland residents can only obtain the permit for pre-approved group tours unless they qualify for one of the exemptions:

They have hukou in one of the 47 cities that are designated by the Taiwanese and Chinese authorities as eligible for individual tours;
They reside outside Mainland China and hold temporary or permanent residence status in Hong Kong, Macau or a third country (prior approval from the Chinese authorities is not required when departing from a place other than Mainland China); or, 
They only visit Quemoy, Matsu Islands and Penghu Islands (in which case a 15-day Exit and Entry Permit can be obtained on arrival provided holding certain travel documents) and will not proceed to other parts of Taiwan.

All Mainland China residents cannot travel to Taiwan on their passports when departing from Mainland China and must hold a Travel Permit to and from Taiwan, colloquially known as Mainland Resident Travel Permit, issued by the Chinese authorities. Before 2017, it is a pink, passport-like travel document, the current permit is an ICAO Doc 9303 TD1 card with an embedded biometric chip, and it must be used along with the appropriate exit endorsements (similar to exit visas). Although travelling with the Mainland Resident Travel Permit is not mandatory when departing from Hong Kong, Macau or a third country, the Exit and Entry Permit itself is usually linked to the document used to apply for the permit, hence travelers are still required to carry the specific travel document they used to apply for the Exit and Entry Permit when travelling to Taiwan.

From 28 March 2017, Mainland Chinese residents are able to apply for the Exit and Entry Permit online if they are residing in a third country.

Issues

Stamps
The ROC government does not stamp either Chinese, BN(O), HKSAR or MSAR passports, or Mainland Resident Travel Permits (although the passports and permits themselves are routinely inspected as would any other passports). The ROC does not recognize British National (Overseas) status as a form of British nationality under its law.

Consular Protection for BN(O) passport holders
Although BN(O) status is not recognized by the ROC as a form of British nationality, the British Government has indicated that it provides the same consular assistance for BN(O) passport holders as other British nationals, with the exception of BN(O) holders who are ethnic Chinese and physically in mainland China, Hong Kong or Macau. Thus, the British Government does not indicate that BN(O)s travelling to ROC cannot enjoy British consular protection. This implies that BN(O)s do enjoy British consular protection in Taiwan, even though the status is not officially recognized by the ROC.

Gallery

See also
Mainland Travel Permit for Taiwan Residents

External links
Taiwan's visa offer a step forward, The Taipei Times 

Act Governing Relations with Hong Kong and Macau
Enforcement Rules of the Act Governing Relations with Hong Kong and Macau

BN(O) Immigration
https://web.archive.org/web/20070929091942/http://www.mac.gov.tw/big5/cnrpt/9007/8.pdf

References

Government of Taiwan
Cross-Strait relations
Hong Kong–Taiwan relations
Macau–Taiwan relations